
Gmina Naruszewo is a rural gmina (administrative district) in Płońsk County, Masovian Voivodeship, in east-central Poland. Its seat is the village of Naruszewo, which lies approximately 11 kilometres (6 mi) south of Płońsk and 55 km (34 mi) north-west of Warsaw.

Villages
Gmina Naruszewo contains the villages and settlements of Beszyno, Dłutowo, Drochówka, Drochowo, Grąbczewo, Januszewo, Kębłowice, Kozarzewo, Krysk, Krysk Nowy, Łazęki, Michałowo, Nacpolsk, Naruszewo, Nowe Naruszewo, Nowy Nacpolsk, Pieścidła, Postróże, Potyry, Rąbież, Radzymin, Radzyminek, Skarboszewo, Skarszyn, Skwary, Sobanice, Sosenkowo, Srebrna, Stachowo, Stary Nacpolsk, Strzembowo, Troski, Wichorowo, Wola-Krysk, Wróblewo, Wronino, Zaborowo, Żukowo and Żukowo-Poświętne.

Neighbouring gminas
Gmina Naruszewo is bordered by the gminas of Bulkowo, Czerwińsk nad Wisłą, Dzierzążnia, Mała Wieś, Płońsk, Wyszogród and Załuski.

References

Polish official population figures 2006

Naruszewo
Płońsk County